Porsa is a town and a municipality in the Morena district of the Indian state of Madhya Pradesh.

Administration 
The governing body is Tehsildar, led by Nagar Palika CMO and Janpad Panchayat CEO.

Economy
The main business centres of the town are: Bargad Chauraha, Imali Chawk, Sadar Bazaar, Shri Sadhu Singh Gali, Ram Nagar, Dhaneta Road and Ater Road Tiraha.  

Shakhwar Dharmshala is situated in the main market. State Bank of India is located at Khanda Road in the Nagar Palika Complex.

Culture 
Porsa is known for its Nagaji Maharaj Temple, thus its alternate name of Nagaji Dham Porsa. Nagaji Mahara, lived in Porsa during the period of the Mughal Emperor Akbar (1542–1605). Many stories tell about the Hindu Guru Sri Nagaji Maharaj, who was a follower of "Naga Lineage". At each poornima (full moon) many people visit this holy shrine and prostrate themselves at the feet of Nagaji Maharaj. 

The album Mahima Nagaji Dham Ki' was created in Nagaji Dham Porsa by Mohammad Arif. It was published on Nagaji Poornima 2016. This fair, or mela, is the way of remembering and paying respect to Porsa. Residents from nearby villages gather at the shrine every winter (November–December) and arrange marriages.

NGOs work in the field of social, cultural and other areas, including Mahila Parishad, Lions Muktidhaam Samiti (Dr. Anil) and Mathur Vaishya Mandal.

Education 
The best school educational institution in porsa is Dron Academy, Little Gaints International,followed by Shivam School

Other prominent schools include Greenlands School Porsa, Aarambh Academy, RVS School Porsa.

Higher education institutes are Shivam College Porsa, Shriram College Porsa, NAS College Porsa, and RVS College Porsa.

Geography 
A large pond sits beside the temple known as Nagaji Taal.

Facilities 
Gorelal ki Dharmshala, Mathur Vaishya Dharmshala, K.G.N garden, C.L garden,Utsav Vatika,  Radhika Palace, Radhe Radhe Garden are popular places for marriages and other events.

Demographics
 India census, Porsa had a population of more than 50,000. 56% were male and 44% female. 17% of the population is under six years of age. The literacy rate is 68%, higher than the national average of 59.5%. Male literacy rate is 75% while 56% of females are literate.

References

Cities and towns in Morena district
Morena